The 1916 Wisconsin Badgers football team represented the University of Wisconsin as a member of the Western Conference during the 1916 college football season. Led Paul Withington in his first and only season as head coach, the Badgers compiled an overall record of 4–2–1 with a mark of 1–2–1 in conference play, placing sixth in the Western Conference. The team's captain was Paul Meyers.

Schedule

References

Wisconsin
Wisconsin Badgers football seasons
Wisconsin Badgers football